Tiberius Plautius Silvanus Aelianus was a Roman patrician who twice served as consul, in 45 and 74 AD.  He was the adopted nephew of Plautia Urgulanilla, first wife of the emperor Claudius.  It is known he offered up the prayer as pontifex when the first stone of the new Capitol was laid in 70 AD.  In some ancient sources he is referred to as Plautius Aelianus, but we learn from an inscription that his full name was Tiberius Plautius Silvanus Aelianus, and that he held many important military commands.

Under Nero he served as the legate of Moesia from 61 to 66 AD, and ruled the province with a "massive scorched earth policy", and from which he is said to have sent shipments of Moesian wheat to alleviate the food supply of the Roman people, possibly in crisis due to the Great Fire of Rome in 64 AD.  Later, he was sent to Hispania, which at the time lacked a provincial governor.  However in 69 AD the emperor Vespasian wished to appoint Aelianus Urban prefect of Rome in place of his murdered brother, Sabinus. As we know from his funerary inscription, Aelianus was in fact recalled to the city, where Vespasian proposed he receive a triumph for his service in Moesia, a gesture implicitly indicting the ungenerous nature of Nero's rule. The senate ultimately voted to approve Vespasian's proposal.

Around 60 AD, Aelianus had brought across the Danube in Moesia "more than 100,000 Transdanubians along with their wives children chiefs or kings (and settled) to pay tribute".

References

Suffect consuls of Imperial Rome
Roman governors of Moesia
Roman governors of Hispania
Urban prefects of Rome
Roman patricians
1st-century Romans
Silvanus Aelianus, Tiberius Plautius
Ancient Roman adoptees